Seal Island is located near Shoalwater, Western Australia in the Perth region.

It is incorporated into the Shoalwater Marine Park.

In December 2016, a rare birth of a southern elephant seal pup on the island was just the third such event recorded in Western Australia in 20 years and only the tenth in Australia since 1958.

See also
Islands of Perth, Western Australia

References

Islands of the Perth region (Western Australia)
Shoalwater Marine Park